Turkish American Neuropsychiatric Association (TANPA) is a non-profit non-governmental organization founded in 1981 by  Erol Ucer. Its stated goal is addressing neuropsychiatric diseases within cooperation of Turkish and American scientists.

References

External links

Turkish organizations and associations in the United States